Delyone Charles Clarence Borden (born 4 March 4) is a Bermudian cricketer, who has played in one One Day International with the Bermudian cricket team. He is a left-handed batsman and a right-arm off-break bowler, who has also represented Bermuda in three ICC Intercontinental Cup games, the 2005 ICC Trophy, the 2004 ICC Americas Championship and the 2006 Stanford 20/20.

References

 

Year of birth missing (living people)
Living people
Bermudian cricketers
Bermuda One Day International cricketers